Gowan Glacier is a glacier about  long in the Heritage Range of the Ellsworth Mountains of Antarctica, flowing north from the vicinity of Cunningham Peak in the Founders Escarpment to enter Minnesota Glacier just east of Welcome Nunatak. It was mapped by the United States Geological Survey from surveys and U.S. Navy air photos, 1961–66, and was named by the Advisory Committee on Antarctic Names for Lieutenant Jimmy L. Gowan, U.S. Navy Medical Corps, officer in charge and doctor at Plateau Station in 1966.

See also
 List of glaciers in the Antarctic
 Glaciology

References

 

Glaciers of Ellsworth Land